Imhullu is a divine wind weapon used by the sky god Marduk to savage the water goddess Tiamat in the Mesopotamian story of creation Enuma Elish.

See also 
Mesopotamia      
Mesopotamian prayer             
Ancient Mesopotamian religion 
Enuma Elish                   
Atra-Hasis
Ninlil

External links 
 Ancient Mesopotamian Gods and Goddesses
 The Babylonian Creation Myth
 Comprehensive list of Mesopotamian gods (World History Encyclopedia)

Mythological weapons